Irie is a feminine given name, the diminutive or pet form of Iris.

 Irie (surname)
 D-Irie, German rapper (b. 1981)
 Elysée Irié Bi Séhi, Ivorian soccer player (b. 1989)
 Irie Love, American reggae singer (b. 1985)

Irie may also refer to:

 Irie, a word in Jamaican Patois and Rastafarian English (see Iyaric)
 Irie Maffia, Hungarian band formed in 2005
 Irie Time, American reggae band formed in the early 1990s
 Muroran Irie Stadium, athletic stadium in Japan